William Voisey DCM, MM (19 November 1891 – 19 October 1964) was an English professional footballer who played as a wing half for Millwall in the Football League and later managed the club during the Second World War. He managed the Great Britain team at the 1936 Summer Olympics. He was nicknamed 'Banger'.

Playing career
Voisey began his career with local Isle of Dogs clubs Glengall Rovers and St John's, before joining Southern League First Division club Millwall in 1908. He remained with the club through the First World War and was capped by England in a wartime fixture in 1919. He was a non-playing reserve for competitive England matches in October 1919 and May 1921 and was a member of the FA XI which toured South Africa in 1920. Voisey played in Millwall's first three seasons of league football after the war, before transferring to newly-elected Third Division South club Bournemouth & Boscombe Athletic in 1923. He ended his playing career in non-League football with Leytonstone. In 2015, a housing block at the Frank Whipple Estate in Tower Hamlets was named Bill Voisey Court in his honour.

Managerial and coaching career 

After retiring from football, Voisey held the position of trainer at Leytonstone, Fulham and Millwall. He managed the Great Britain team to the quarter-finals of the 1936 Summer Olympics and later managed Millwall during the Second World War. In 1941, at the age of 50, he named himself in the lineup as a player for a London War Cup match versus West Ham United. After sustaining injuries during an air raid in April 1943 (in which The Den received a direct hit), Voisey was forced to relinquish his management role in November 1944.

Personal life 
Voisey was married with five children, two of whom died in infancy. One son, Harry, became a footballer and made appearances for Millwall during the Second World War. Voisey served as a sergeant in the Royal Field Artillery during the First World War and was awarded the Distinguished Conduct Medal, the Military Medal, the Croix de guerre during the course of his service and was mentioned in dispatches. His DCM citation reads:

Career statistics

References

External links 

 

1891 births
1964 deaths
English footballers
England wartime international footballers
English football managers
Millwall F.C. players
Millwall F.C. managers
Association football wing halves
Association football fullbacks
English Football League players
AFC Bournemouth players
Leytonstone F.C. players
British Army personnel of World War I
Royal Field Artillery soldiers
Southern Football League players
Recipients of the Distinguished Conduct Medal
Recipients of the Military Medal
Recipients of the Croix de guerre (Belgium)
Fulham F.C. non-playing staff